Saint Aurea may refer to:

Aurea of Córdoba (810–856), Spanish saint, nun, and martyr
Aurea of Ostia, 3rd-century martyr
Áurea of San Millán (1043–1070), 11th-century Spanish saint
Saint Aurea of Paris, a 7th-century Parisien abbess and saint from Syria

See also
Santa Aurea, a church in Ostia 
Aurea (disambiguation)